Shilov is a widespread family name among Russians. It is derived from the word "шило", awl.  Notable people of this name include:

Alexander Ivanovich Shilov (?-1799), one of the founders of the Skoptzy sect
Alexander Maxovich Shilov (b. 1943), prominent Russian portrait painter
Alexander Yevgenyevich Shilov (b. 1930), Soviet expert in physical chemistry
Georgii Evgen'evich Shilov (1917–1975), Soviet mathematician and expert in functional analysis
Igor Alexandrovich Shilov (b. 1921), Soviet biologist ecologist
Nikolay Alexandrovich Shilov (1872–1930), Russian expert in physical chemistry
Sergei Evgenevich Shilov (b. 1969), notable Russian writer and essayist
Vassily Shilov, a Russian explorer and merchant who created the first map of the Aleutian Islands in 1763

Russian-language surnames